Dinesh "Dino" Lalvani (born 1973) is a British businessman, and the chairman and chief executive officer of Binatone, founded by his father Gulu Lalvani, and Hubble Connected - an IoT platform.

Career 
Lalvani purchased Binatone, a company that produces mobile phones, GPS devices, baby monitors and other cordless devices, from his father, Gulu Lalvani, in 2008. Since his acquisition, he has been the chairman and CEO of the company. He has previously been COO, and sales and marketing director. In 2012, Binatone became a global licensee of Motorola, producing audio equipment, GPS devices, dash cams, and other electronics under the brand.

Lalvani is the CEO of the internet-of-things company Hubble Connected, which develops wireless products for Motorola.

Personal life
He has been married to Indian actress Lisa Haydon since 2016, and they have three chldren.

References

Living people
Dino
British chief executives
1970s births
British businesspeople of Indian descent
British people of Sindhi descent